The 2016–17 SV Werder Bremen season is the 107th season in the club's football history. In 2016–17 the club plays in the Bundesliga, the top tier of German football league system. It is the clubs 34th consecutive season in this league, having been promoted from the 2. Bundesliga in 1981.

The club also is taking part in the 2016–17 edition of the DFB-Pokal.

Players

Squad

Transfers

In

Out

Friendly matches

Dresden Cup

Competitions

Overview

Bundesliga

League table

Results summary

Results by round

Matches

DFB-Pokal

Statistics

Appearances and goals

|-
! colspan=14 style=background:#dcdcdc; text-align:center| Goalkeepers

|-
! colspan=14 style=background:#dcdcdc; text-align:center| Defenders

|-
! colspan=14 style=background:#dcdcdc; text-align:center| Midfielders

|-
! colspan=14 style=background:#dcdcdc; text-align:center| Forwards

|-
! colspan=14 style=background:#dcdcdc; text-align:center| Players transferred out during the season

Goalscorers

Last updated: 20 May 2017

Clean sheets

Last updated: 29 April 2017

Disciplinary record

Last updated: 20 May 2017

References

SV Werder Bremen seasons
Werder Bremen